Soloe is a genus of moths in the family Erebidae. The genus was erected by Francis Walker in 1854.

Species
 Soloe fumipennis Hampson, 1910
 Soloe sexmaculata (Plötz, 1880)
 Soloe splendida Toulgoët, 1980
 Soloe trigutta Walker, 1854
 Soloe tripunctata Druce, 1896

References

Aganainae
Moth genera